Leptotrophon virginiae is a species of sea snail, a marine gastropod mollusk in the family Muricidae, the murex snails or rock snails.

Description
The length of the shell attains 8 mm.

Distribution
This marine specuemen occurts off New Caledonia at a depth of 250 m.

References

 Houart, R. (1995). The Trophoninae (Gastropoda: Muricidae) of the New Caledonia region. in: Bouchet, P. (Ed.) Résultats des Campagnes MUSORSTOM 14. Mémoires du Muséum national d'Histoire naturelle. Série A, Zoologie. 167: 459–498.

External links
 MNHN, Paris: holotype

Muricidae
Gastropods described in 1995